Jim Gillespie (born 4 November 1957) is a Scottish former professional footballer who played for Weirs Recreation, Queen's Park, Gent, Standard Wettern, Motherwell, Morton and Clyde, as a forward.

References

1957 births
Living people
Scottish footballers
Queen's Park F.C. players
K.A.A. Gent players
Motherwell F.C. players
Greenock Morton F.C. players
Clyde F.C. players
Scottish Football League players
Belgian Pro League players
Association football forwards
Scottish expatriate footballers
Scottish expatriate sportspeople in Belgium
Expatriate footballers in Belgium